Bukkeholshøi is a mountain in Lom Municipality in Innlandet county, Norway. The mountain is surrounded by several other notable mountains including Leirhøi to the east; Nørdre Hellstugutinden and Midtre Hellstugutinden to the southeast; Urdadalstindene and Semelholstinden to the south; Tverrbytthornet and Kyrkja to the southwest; Store Bukkeholstinden and the Tverrbottindene ridge to the west; Bukkehøe and Lindbergtinden to the northwest; and Store Styggehøe to the north.

See also
List of mountains of Norway by height

References

Jotunheimen
Lom, Norway
Mountains of Innlandet